1996 Malta Open is a darts tournament, which took place in Malta in 1996.

Results

References

1996 in darts
1996 in Maltese sport
Darts in Malta